The tornado outbreak of November 30 – December 2, 2018 was a late-season tornado outbreak that occurred across portions of the West South Central states and Midwestern United States. As a potent shortwave trough moved across the southern portions of the country, it was met with ample moisture return and destabilization, resulting in widespread severe thunderstorms that produced damaging winds, hail, and tornadoes. The event began late on November 30 in Oklahoma, spreading east and resulting in one fatality in Aurora, Missouri. Several tornadic supercells moved across portions of Illinois on December 1, and resulted in 29 confirmed tornadoes. This outbreak was the largest December tornado event on record in Illinois history, surpassing the December 1957 tornado outbreak sequence. The most significant tornado of the event was an EF3 that impacted Taylorville, Illinois, damaging or destroying hundreds of structures and injuring 22 people.

Meteorological synopsis

November 30
The first advertised threat for organized severe weather came on November 26, when the Storm Prediction Center (SPC) outlined a day 5 risk area across portions of the Southern Plains. A large slight risk was introduced for portions of Oklahoma, Texas, Arkansas, Louisiana, and Mississippi on November 28, with an upgrade to enhanced risk for much of those same locations the next morning. On November 30, a vigorous shortwave trough—part of an active wave train within the subtropical jet—progressed from Arizona into the Central Plains. The Storm Prediction Center maintained an enhanced risk for severe weather, including a 10% hatched risk area for tornadoes. As an expansive  jet stream pushed through the trough, it began to take on a negative tilt. A surface low developed over Colorado in response, pushing into eastern Kansas by early on December 1. In Oklahoma, a large and long-tracked EF2 wedge tornado impacted areas near Tenkiller Ferry Lake, damaging or destroying many homes and other structures, downing countless trees, and injuring 5 people. Another EF2 tornado struck Van Buren, Arkansas, causing major damage to several homes. A few other weak tornadoes were also confirmed.

December 1

During the very early morning hours of December 1, an EF1 tornado struck the southern part of Aurora, Missouri, killing one person at a motel and damaging a few other nearby businesses. Later that day, the deepening area of low pressure—initially over Kansas—shifted into Iowa as it occluded. The aforementioned shortwave progressed into the Mississippi River Valley, supporting the formation of a secondary surface low pressure over Missouri that moved toward the Great Lakes. A mid-level area of low pressure was centered farther west near the surface low, and was a cold-core low, within a longwave trough extending over the outbreak area and which provided cold air aloft, steeper lapse rates, and thus higher convective instability. Low level instability as measured by surface to  CAPE was also significant, especially for a cold-core setup, reaching values of 200 J/kg. Within the warm sector of this feature, a pronounced dry slot allowed for relatively substantial destabilization, with mixed-layer CAPE increasing to 500–1,200 J/kg. Numerous tornadoes were reported in Illinois, most of which occurred as a result two long-tracked, cyclic supercell thunderstorms. This included an EF3 wedge tornado that caused major damage throughout portions of Taylorville, Illinois, injuring 22 people. At 5:15 PM, a tornado emergency was issued for Central Christian County. A total of 406 homes in Taylorville sustained some form of damage; 66 homes suffered major damage; and 34 homes experienced severe damage or total destruction. An EF1 tornado caused moderate damage in Beardstown, while EF2 tornadoes ripped roofs off of homes near Litchfield and Le Roy. Another EF2 touched down in Stoningon, snapping trees and power poles, and destroying garages before leveling several barns outside of town. Producing 29 tornadoes in the state, this was the largest December tornado outbreak in Illinois history. Further south, a secondary area of severe weather produced two EF0 tornadoes in Alabama.

December 2
A few isolated tornadoes continued to touch down across the Southern United States on December 2. This included strong EF3 tornado that struck the Naval Submarine Base Kings Bay in Camden County, Georgia, tossing heavy objects and injuring four people. Rare severe thunderstorm watches with an isolated tornado warning were issued as far north as southern Ontario in Canada. No tornadoes were reported in Ontario; however, a lightning strike sparked a fire at a home near Mount Forest, causing an estimated CA$175,000 in damage.

Confirmed tornadoes

November 30 event

December 1 event

December 2 event

See also
 Tornadoes of 2018
 List of United States tornadoes from August to October 2018

Notes

References

External links
 Tornado Outbreak of December 1, 2018 (National Weather Service Lincoln, Illinois)
 December 1st, 2018 Tornado Outbreak (National Weather Service St. Louis, Missouri)
 December 1, 2018 Tornadoes (NWS Davenport/Quad Cities, IA/IL)
 2 Brief Tornadoes on December 1, 2018 (NWS Birmingham, AL)

2018 in Arkansas
2018 in Oklahoma
2018 in Missouri
2018 in Alabama
2018 in Illinois
November 2018 events in the United States
December 2018 events in the United States
F3 tornadoes
Tornadoes of 2018
2018 natural disasters in the United States